The Tour of South China Sea is an annual professional road bicycle racing classic one-day race held in Guangdong, Hong Kong and Macau since 1996 as part of the UCI Asia Tour. It has been held during Christmas holiday every year since 1996 to celebrate the handover of Hong Kong and Macau to China. The race was won four times by Wong Kam-po. The race is currently rated by the International Cycling Union (UCI) as a 1.2 category race.

Past winners

General classification

References

External links 

 
 Statistics at the-sports.org
 Tour of South China Sea at cqranking.com
 

Cycle races in China
Cycle races in Hong Kong
UCI Asia Tour races
Recurring sporting events established in 1996
1996 establishments in Hong Kong
1996 establishments in Macau
Cycle races in Macau
Winter events in China